Nong Hua Raet (หนองหัวแรต) is a subdistrict municipality (thesaban tambon) in the Nong Bun Mak District of Nakhon Ratchasima Province, Thailand. It was created as subdistrict administrative organization in 1996 and upgraded to a municipality in 2008. It covers 93.99 km2, 15 villages, and 8,265 citizens.

References

Thesaban of Nakhon Ratchasima Province